Chance was built in India c.1799. No other data is available on this ship.

The French frigate  captured several ships in early 1799 in the Bay of Bengal. Among them were Chance, Johnson, master, and Earl Mornington, Cook, master. The French put the crews of the captured ships on one of the captured vessels, and then sent that vessel to Madras as a cartel. Chance was taken in Balasore Roads, and sent to Île de France.

She was carrying a cargo of rice.
 
As she was sailing towards England, Chance was lost near Saint Mary's Bay, Madagascar in May 1799.

Notes

Citations

References
 
  
 
 

1790s ships
British ships built in India
Age of Sail merchant ships of England
Captured ships
Maritime incidents in 1799
Shipwrecks in the Indian Ocean